Jake Abel (born 30 October 1997 in Australia) is an Australian rugby union player who plays for the  in Global Rapid Rugby and the Super Rugby AU competition. His original playing position is scrum-half. He was named in the Force squad for the Global Rapid Rugby competition in 2020.

Reference list

External links
Rugby.com.au profile
itsrugby.co.uk profile

1997 births
Living people
Australian rugby union players
Rugby union scrum-halves
Rugby union players from Melbourne
Canberra Vikings players
Sydney (NRC team) players
Western Force players
People from Werribee, Victoria
21st-century Australian people
Skyactivs Hiroshima players